The 2016–17 Grambling State Tigers men's basketball team represented Grambling State University during the 2016–17 NCAA Division I men's basketball season. The Tigers, led by third-year head coach Shawn Walker, played their home games at the Fredrick C. Hobdy Assembly Center in Grambling, Louisiana as members of the Southwestern Athletic Conference. They finished the season 16–17, 10–8 in SWAC play to finish in a four way tie for third place. As the 5-seed in the SWAC tournament they defeated Prairie View A&M before losing in the semifinals to Texas Southern.

On March 22, it was announced that head coach Shawn Walker's contract would not be renewed. He finished at Grambling State with a three-year record of 25–68. On May 12, Grambling State hired Donte Jackson from Stillman of the NAIA as new head coach.

Previous season
The Tigers finished the 2015–16 season 7–24, 4–14 record in SWAC play to finish last in the conference. They lost to Mississippi Valley State in the first round of the SWAC tournament.

Roster

Schedule and results

|-
!colspan=9 style=| Non-conference regular season

|-
!colspan=9 style=| SWAC regular season

|-
!colspan=9 style=| SWAC tournament

References

Grambling State Tigers men's basketball seasons
Grambling State
Gramb
Gramb